Robinaldia is a genus of parasitic flies in the family Tachinidae.

Species
Robinaldia angustata Herting, 1983

References

Exoristinae
Diptera of Europe
Diptera of Africa
Tachinidae genera